Germinal was an Uruguayan weekly newspaper, the central organ of the Socialist Party of Uruguay, founded in 1921. In 1931 Germinal was superseded by a new Socialist Party newspaper, the daily El Sol.

References

1921 establishments in Uruguay
1931 disestablishments in Uruguay
Defunct newspapers published in Uruguay
Newspapers established in 1921
Publications disestablished in 1931
Spanish-language newspapers
Socialism in Uruguay
Socialist newspapers